Subbu is a 2001 Telugu-language romantic drama film directed by Rudraraju Suresh Varma and produced by Kanakapura Srinivas and P.M. Hari Kumar. It stars N. T. Rama Rao Jr., succeeding his role in the hit Student No.1, and Sonali Joshi. This film was dubbed in Hindi as Tiger: One Man Army.

Cast
N. T. Rama Rao Jr. as Bala Subramanyam
Sonali Joshi as Neeraja
Brahmanandam
A. V. S.
M. S. Narayana
Dharmavarapu Subramanyam as Principal
Banerjee
Kallu Chidambaram
Krishna Reddy
Jogi Naidu

Critical reception
Upon the release, Jeevi of idlebrain.com gave 3/5 stating "NTR is improving from film to film. To put in a more frank way, people started accepting NTR as his number of films is increasing (remember the old adage - tinaga tinaga vemu teeyanundu)". Telugu cinema.com stated "The film is below the expectations in all the senses. Songs in New Zealand are ok. Other songs are not up to the mark". The movie was an average grosser at the box office.

Soundtrack
The music was composed by Mani Sharma and released by Aditya Music.

References

External links 
 

2000s Telugu-language films
Films scored by Mani Sharma